is a train station in the city of Shibata, Niigata Prefecture, Japan, operated by East Japan Railway Company (JR East).

Lines
Nishi-Shibata Station is served by the Hakushin Line, and is 24.3 kilometers from the starting point of the line at Niigata Station.

Layout

The station consists of two ground-level opposed side platforms connected by a footbridge, serving two tracks. The station is unattended.

Platforms

History
The station opened on 11 February 1957. With the privatization of Japanese National Railways (JNR) on 1 April 1987, the station came under the control of JR East. The station was physically relocated 200 meters towards Shibata Station in October 2000.

Surrounding area
 AEON MALL SHIBATA (Shopping mall)

See also
 List of railway stations in Japan

External links
 JR East station information 

Railway stations in Niigata Prefecture
Hakushin Line
Railway stations in Japan opened in 1957
Stations of East Japan Railway Company
Shibata, Niigata